No. 503 (City of Lincoln) Squadron RAuxAF was an auxiliary squadron of the Royal Air Force. It operated as a bomber squadron in the 1920s and 1930s, but was disbanded before the outbreak of the Second World War.

History
The squadron was formed on 5 October 1926 at RAF Waddington in Lincolnshire as No. 503 (Bombing) Squadron of the Special Reserve, manned by part-time volunteers. It was at first equipped with Fairey Fawn light day bombers. It re-equipped with the partly wooden Handley Page Hyderabad heavy night bomber in 1929, receiving the improved, all-metal Handley Page Hinaidi from 1933. Some squadron members thought the Hyderabad superior to the Hinaidi, but when a squadron member discovered dry rot in the longeron of a Hyderabad they settled for the 'newcomer', some almost having spent their life of 700 flying hours already.

In October 1935, it changed role again to become a day bomber squadron, receiving Westland Wallaces. These were replaced by the Hawker Hart in June 1936, these in turn starting to be replaced by the updated Hawker Hind in July 1938. However, in 1938 it was decided to switch the role of the Auxiliary Air Force to that of air defence, and on 1 November 503 Squadron was disbanded by renumbering it to No.616 (South Yorkshire) Squadron and moving it to RAF Doncaster.

Aircraft operated

Squadron bases

Commanding officers

See also
 List of Royal Air Force aircraft squadrons

References

Notes

Bibliography

External links
 503 Squadron Royal Air Force
 RAF Squadron Histories 500–520 rafweb.org

503
Military units and formations established in 1926
503